is a train station in the village of Kariwa, Kariwa District, Niigata Prefecture, Japan, operated by the East Japan Railway Company (JR East).

Lines
Arahama Station is served by the Echigo Line and is 6.6 kilometers from the terminus of the line at Kashiwazaki Station.

Station layout
The station consists of one ground-level side platform serving a single bi-directional track.

The station is unattended. Suica farecard cannot be used at this station.

History
Arahama Station opened on 15 June 1915. With the privatization of Japanese National Railways (JNR) on 1 April 1987, the station came under the control of JR East. The current station building was completed in 2008.

See also
 List of railway stations in Japan

References

External links

 JR East station information 

Railway stations in Niigata Prefecture
Railway stations in Japan opened in 1915
Echigo Line
Stations of East Japan Railway Company
Kariwa, Niigata